Jessica Cauffiel (born March 30, 1976) is an American actress and singer. She is best known for her roles as Margot in Legally Blonde (2001) and Tori in White Chicks (2004). She is also known as a scream queen for her roles in the slasher films Urban Legends: Final Cut (2000) and Valentine (2001), as Sandra and Lily, respectively.

Early life
Cauffiel was born in Detroit, Michigan. Her mother, Deborah, is a social worker, and her father, Lowell Cauffiel, is a true crime author, screenwriter and television documentary producer. She received a Bachelor of Fine Arts degree in Musical Theatre and Vocal Jazz at the University of Michigan School of Music. She performed in several bands, including Jazodity and Tribe of Zoe. Before graduating college, she sang on a cruise ship and in jazz and blues clubs.

Career

Acting
She was born and raised in the theater and began her career in New York. Off-Broadway and regional theater productions include: Tony Award winner Robert Lopez's (Avenue Q) 1001 Nights, City of Angels, Antigone, Assassins, Cowboy Mouth, Cabaret, A Midsummer Night's Dream, Company, Baby, Music Man, Shoppers Carried by Escalators and Grand Hotel, amongst others.

Cauffiel's debut film role was playing Steve Martin and Goldie Hawn's daughter in the 1999 remake of The Out-of-Towners, and her debut TV role in Law & Order. That same year Cauffiel played Kit, Niles Cranes' girlfriend, in the sitcom Frasier. In 2000, she appeared in the hit comedy Road Trip and Urban Legends: Final Cut with Eva Mendes, and was a lead in the 2001 film, Valentine, which co-starred Katherine Heigl. That year, Maxim magazine featured her in the publication and their online Girls of Maxim gallery. Cauffiel subsequently appeared in several more films aimed at a young audience, including box-office hits such as both Legally Blonde films and the 2004 comedy White Chicks. She also co-starred in the independent romantic comedy You Stupid Man alongside Milla Jovovich, directed by Brian Burns.

She followed a two-year recurring role on The Drew Carey Show with featured roles in several studio films, like the Farrelly Brothers' Stuck on You and Guess Who, and in 2005, co-starred in the Burt Munro biopic period drama The World's Fastest Indian with Anthony Hopkins. She followed that with a supporting role, playing both a young actress and an elderly pancake maven (Mother Paula) in the 2006 feature film adaptation of the award-winning novel, Hoot, by Carl Hiaasen, and a 2006–2007 recurring role on the hit NBC series My Name Is Earl.

After a nearly two-year break from acting, she landed the lead role in the 2009 Hallmark Channel TV movie drama Ice Dreams, in which she plays Amy Clayton, a former Olympic figure skater who begrudgingly agrees to coach a teenage girl, and must confront her demons in the process.

In 2009, Jessica made the comedic film short Bed Ridden, which she produced as well as starred in alongside Joel David Moore, Alan Tudyk, and Garrett Morris. It was written and also produced by her father, Lowell Cauffiel, and director Jonathan Heap, who was nominated for an Oscar for his short "12:01 PM". All proceeds went to The Clare Foundation in order to raise awareness for drug and alcohol recovery for the homeless and those in need of treatment.

Cauffiel can speak with a Russian accent and has played a Russian in the movie D.E.B.S. (as an assassin) and in episodes of My Name Is Earl (as a mail-order bride called Tatiana with a large mole).

Music
Cauffiel is a trained singer and has studied and performed for over 20 years in the Western classical, musical theatre, jazz, pop, blues, and Eastern devotional vocal mediums. She also plays piano, guitar and percussion. On the occasion of the March 10, 2004 anniversary of the Tibetan Uprising Day, she and renowned Bollywood percussionist and composer Sivamani, with whom she is currently writing an album, performed live in Dharamshala, India for the 14th Dalai Lama and approximately 20,000 other monks and visitors from around the world. She also sang on the world music Grammy finalist album Shanti by Snatam Kaur and "Grateful Ganesh" by Guruganesh Singh Khalsa.

Filmography

Film

Television

References

External links
 

1976 births
20th-century American actresses
21st-century American actresses
Actresses from Detroit
American film actresses
American television actresses
Living people
University of Michigan School of Music, Theatre & Dance alumni
21st-century American singers
21st-century American women singers